Ihor Tsvietov (born 2 March 1994) is a Ukrainian Paralympic athlete with cerebral palsy. He competes as T35-classified athlete in 100 and 200 metres sprinting events. He won two gold medals at the 2016 Summer Paralympics held in Rio de Janeiro, Brazil: in the men's 100 metres T35 event and in the men's 200 metres T35 event. He also won the silver medal in the men's 100 metres T35 and men's 200 metres T35 events at the 2020 Summer Paralympics in Tokyo, Japan.

Career 

He won the gold medal in the men's 100 metres T35 and men's 200 metres T35 events at the 2017 World Para Athletics Championships held in London, United Kingdom.

Tsvietov also won the gold medals in the men's 100 metres T35 and men's 200 metres T35 events at the 2018 World Para Athletics European Championships. In both events he was the only medalist as there were only two competitors, Tsvietov and Jordan Howe, in these events.

At the 2019 World Para Athletics Championships held in Dubai, United Arab Emirates, he set a new world-record time of 11.07s in the men's 100 metres T35 event and also a new world-record time of 23.04s in the men's 200 metres T35 event.

After winning the silver medal at the 100 m T35 during the 2020 Tokyo Paralympics Tsvetov refused to take a joint photo with Russian bronze and gold medallist Artem Kalashian and Dmitrii Safronov due to strained Russia–Ukraine relations.

Achievements

References

External links 

 

Living people
1994 births
Paralympic athletes of Ukraine
Athletes (track and field) at the 2016 Summer Paralympics
Athletes (track and field) at the 2020 Summer Paralympics
Medalists at the 2016 Summer Paralympics
Medalists at the 2020 Summer Paralympics
Paralympic gold medalists for Ukraine
Paralympic silver medalists for Ukraine
Paralympic medalists in athletics (track and field)
World record holders in Paralympic athletics
Ukrainian male sprinters
Track and field athletes with cerebral palsy
World Para Athletics Championships winners
Medalists at the World Para Athletics European Championships
Sportspeople from Mykolaiv